David or Dave Porter may refer to:

Politicians
 David Porter (British politician) (born 1948), Conservative Member of Parliament for Waveney, 1987–1997
 David Porter (Canadian politician) (1849–1893), Ontario businessman and political figure
 David J. Porter (politician) (born 1956), Republican member of the Texas Railroad Commission
 David R. Porter (1788–1867), Pennsylvania politician
 Dave Porter (politician), Canadian politician

Military
 David Porter (naval officer) (1780–1843), United States Navy officer and ambassador
 David Dixon Porter (1813–1891), his son, American Civil War Navy officer
 David Dixon Porter (Medal of Honor) (1877–1944), officer in the Philippine–American War

Sports
 David Porter (figure skater) (born 1949), Canadian ice dancing champion
 David Porter (sport shooter) (born 1953), Australian sport shooter
 Dave Porter (sportsman), NCAA wrestler and football player

Music
 David Porter (musician) (born 1941), American musician
 Dave Porter (composer), American composer

Others
 David Porter (Australian judge), justice of the Supreme Court of Tasmania
 David Porter (bishop) (1906–1993), bishop of Aston in the Church of England
 David H. Porter (1935–2016), professor and past president of Skidmore College
 David J. Porter (judge) (born 1966), United States circuit judge
 David Richard Porter (1882–1973), figure in YMCA
 David Stewart Porter (1909–1989), U.S. federal judge
 Dave Porter (Home and Away), fictional character in TV series Home and Away

See also
 David Porter Heap (1843–1910), American engineer
 David Porter McCorkle, Confederate Lieutenant in the American Civil War